The Silence of the Quandts (German: Das Schweigen der Quandts) is a documentary about the , originally aired in October 2007.

See also 
 Nazi Billionaires

References 

2007 films
German-language films